China Northern Rare Earth (Group) High-tech Co., Ltd., known as China Northern Rare Earth and abbreviated CNREG, is based in , Baotou, Inner Mongolia, China. The company's products include rare earth concentrate and highly processed rare earth products.

The company is listed on the Shanghai Stock Exchange. Its CEO is Dianqing Zhao (赵殿清), and its general manager is Yedong Qu (瞿业栋).

In 2018, the company made a profit of 606 million RMB on revenue of 13.85 billion RMB.

History
In 2008, China Northern Rare Earth merged with Baotou Steel Rare Earth, and by 2009 the company's market share reached 90%. In 2010, the company's performance rose dramatically, increasing by a factor of 12.46. In 2014, Baotou Steel Rare Earth established China Northern Rare Earth Group, one of the largest rare earth corporations in China.

References

External links
 

Companies in the SSE 50 Index
Companies based in Baotou
Rare earth companies